Kyzyl-Oktyabr (Qıźıl Oktyabr) is a rural locality (a village) in Kushmanakovsky Selsoviet, Burayevsky District, Bashkortostan, Russia. The population was 6 as of 2010. There is 1 street.

Geography 
Kyzyl-Oktyabr is located 18 km west of Burayevo (the district's administrative centre) by road. Karatamak is the nearest rural locality.

References 

Rural localities in Burayevsky District